Richard McRae Stewart (18 March 1873 – 28 September 1933) was an Australian rules footballer who played with Carlton in the Victorian Football League (VFL).

References

External links 		
		
Dick Stewart's profile at Blueseum

1873 births
1933 deaths
Australian rules footballers from Victoria (Australia)
Carlton Football Club players